Hunstad Church is a parish church of the Church of Norway in Bodø Municipality in Nordland county, Norway.  It is located in the town of Bodø. It is the church for the Innstranden parish which is part of the Bodø domprosti (deanery) in the Diocese of Sør-Hålogaland. The white, concrete church was built in a rectangular style in 2013 by the architect Johnny Kristensen from the company U2 Arkitekter. The church seats about 400 people.

The church is rather unique in Norway because it is a part of a large building complex which includes a school, library, cafe, and leisure centre.

Media gallery

See also
List of churches in Sør-Hålogaland

References

Churches in Bodø
Churches in Nordland
21st-century Church of Norway church buildings
Churches completed in 2013
2013 establishments in Norway
Rectangular churches in Norway
Concrete churches in Norway